Abdul the Damned (also known as Abdul Hamid) is a 1935 British drama film directed by Karl Grune and starring Fritz Kortner, Nils Asther and John Stuart. It was made at the British International Pictures studios by Alliance-Capitol Productions. It is set in the Ottoman Empire in the years before the First World War, during the reign of Sultan Abdul Hamid II and the republican Young Turks who dethroned him for power.

Cast

 Fritz Kortner as Sultan Abdul Hamid II / Kelar
 Nils Asther as Chief of Police Kadar-Pasha
 John Stuart as Captain Talak-Bey
 Adrienne Ames as Therese Alder
 Esme Percy as Ali - Chief Eunuch
 Walter Rilla as Hassan-Bey
 Charles Carson as General Hilmi-Pasha
 Patric Knowles as Omar - Hilmi's Attache
 Eric Portman as  Conspirator
 Clifford Heatherley as Court Doctor
 Henry B. Longhurst as General of the Bodyguards
 Annie Esmond as Therese's Train Companion
 Harold Saxon-Snell as Chief Interrogator
 George Zucco as Officer of the Firing Squad
 Robert Naylor as Opera Singer
 Warren Jenkins as Young Turk Singer
 Henry Peterson as Spy
 Arthur Hardy as Ambassador

Critical reception
The New York Times wrote, "Although the film achieves a few moments of dramatic interest—chiefly through the performance of the Continental Fritz Kortner—it is in the main a tedious and uninspired biography, scarred by hypodermic injections of stale melodrama"; whereas Film Weekly found it "magnificently acted by Fritz Kortner. Interesting, impressive and, for the most part, gripping entertainment."

References

Bibliography
Low, Rachael. Filmmaking in 1930s Britain. George Allen & Unwin, 1985.

External links

1935 films
British historical drama films
1930s historical drama films
Films shot at British International Pictures Studios
Films directed by Karl Grune
Films set in the Ottoman Empire
Films set in the 1900s
Columbia Pictures films
British black-and-white films
1935 drama films
1930s English-language films
1930s British films